RM, rm, R.M. or R&M may refer to:

Arts and entertainment
 RM (rapper), born Kim Nam-joon, a South Korean rapper, composer and music producer
 The R.M., a comedy film
 Random map, a randomly generated map in strategy games
 RauteMusik.FM, a German Internet Radio Station
 Running Man, a variety show aired on South Korean television
 Race Modification, a gameplay feature in the Gran Turismo series of video games

Business and finance

Companies
 RM, a clothing line by Roland Mouret
 RM Education, a British computer firm
 RM Sotheby's, a classic car auctioneers
 Récoltant-Manipulant, a designation for champagne producers with their own label
 Reichle & De-Massari (R&M), a Swiss family tech business

Currencies
 Malaysian ringgit, Malaysia (ISO 4217: MYR)
 Reichsmark (ℛℳ), German currency during the Weimar Republic and the Third Reich

Methods
 Rapid manufacturing, computer-automated additive manufacturing method
 Records management, an information archiving practice
 Relationship marketing, in marketing jargon
 Risk management, identification and prioritization of business risks

Military
 Radioman, a rating for the United States Navy 
 Regia Marina, the Italian Navy prior to 1946
 Royal Marines, the United Kingdom's amphibious forces

Places

Countries
 Republic of Macedonia (now Northern Macedonia)
 Madagascar, per the UN Conventions on Road Traffic
 Marshall Islands, per the American FIPS 10-4 standard
 Moldova, per the World Meteorological Organisation
 Romania, per the Library of Congress

Forms of place
 Ranch to Market Road, a designation for minor state highways in Texas, US
 Rural municipality, a type of district in Canada

Locations in the United States
 Richard Montgomery High School, Rockville, Maryland
 Richmond, Virginia
 Rocky Mount, North Carolina

Regions
 RM postal area, the UK postcode area for Romford
 Province of Rome, Italy (ISO 3166-2:IT code)
 Santiago Metropolitan Region of Chile

Science and technology

Biology and medicine
 Range of motion, or range of movement, the distance a joint can move between the flexed and extended positions
 Recurrent miscarriage, referring to multiple consecutive miscarriages
 Regenerative medicine, the process of replacing or regenerating human cells, tissues or organs to restore or establish normal function
 Relative migration, in gel electrophoresis
 Respiratory mechanics, the branch of human physiology focusing upon the bio-mechanics of respiration
 Rhabdomyolysis, a condition in which damaged skeletal muscle tissue breaks down, potentially leading to kidney failure
 Rhesus monkey, a species of Old World monkey native to South, Central and Southeast Asia
 Routine and microscopy, or urinalysis, an array of tests performed on urine

Computing
 rm (Unix), a Unix command for the removal of files
 RealMedia, a data format provided by RealNetworks
 Relational Model, a database model based on predicate logic and set theory
 Reset Mode (ANSI), an ANSI X3.64 escape sequence
 Resource Management, a service in Asynchronous Transfer Mode (ATM) networks
 Reuters Messaging, an instant messenger application

Physics
 Faraday rotation measure, in astrophysics
 Magnetic Reynolds number, a ratio used in magnetohydrodynamics
 Molière radius (Rm), in high energy physics

Vehicles
 AEC Routemaster, the traditional London bus
 China Railways RM, a Chinese steam locomotive
 SJ Rm, a Swedish locomotive
 Rail Motor, a self-propelled rail car

Sport
 One rep maximum, or 1RM, a weight training term
 Real Madrid C.F., a Spanish football club

Titles
 Radioman, a former rate of the U.S. Navy
 Registered Midwife, a legally registered or certified professional midwife
 Reiki Master, one level of the three-tiered hierarchy of Reiki
 Resident magistrate
 Returned Missionary, a young Mormon who have served as a missionary

Other uses
Récoltant-Manipulant, champagne made by the winegrower
 Reasoning Mind, an American school math initiative
 Romansh language, spoken in Switzerland (ISO 639-1 code: rm)
 Rosmah Mansor, wife of Malaysia Prime Minister Dato' Seri Najib Razak
 Research Memo, a type of Congressional Research Service Report

See also

 Regional municipality
 
 MR (disambiguation)